The Broxbourne Council election, 1973 was held to elect council members of the Broxbourne Borough Council, the local government authority of the borough of Broxbourne, Hertfordshire, England.

Election results

Results summary 

The first election for Broxbourne Borough Council took place on 7 June 1973.

Broxbourne Borough Council was created by the Local Government Act 1972 as a successor authority to:

 Cheshunt Urban District Council
 Hoddesdon Urban District Council.

From the date of the election until 1 April 1974 Broxbourne Borough Council acted as a "shadow authority" to Cheshunt UDC and Hoddesdon UDC.

40 Borough Council seats were contested in 13 wards.

In 3 wards (Cheshunt North, Hoddesdon Northern and Theobalds) 4 council seats were contested

In 1 ward (Wormley) 1 council seat was contested

In the remaining 9 wards 3 council seats were contested.

The political balance of the newly formed Borough Council was

Conservative 28 seats
Labour 12 seats

Ward results

References
Lea Valley Mercury Friday 15 June 1973 edition
Cheshunt & Waltham Telegraph Friday 15 June 1973 edition

1973
1973 English local elections
1970s in Hertfordshire